The Register and Tribune Building is a historic commercial building at 715 Locust Street in Des Moines, Iowa.  Built in 1918, it served as home to The Des Moines Register, one of Iowa's leading newspapers, until about 2000, when the presses were moved to another building, and 2013, when the Register owner, the Gannett Corporation, moved out in 2013.  It was designed by one of Iowa's leading architectural firms, Proudfoot, Bird and Rawson, with later additions by equally prominent firms.

The building was listed on the National Register of Historic Places in 2016.

See also
National Register of Historic Places listings in Des Moines, Iowa

References

Commercial buildings completed in 1918
National Register of Historic Places in Des Moines, Iowa
Commercial buildings on the National Register of Historic Places in Iowa
Office buildings in Des Moines, Iowa